G. W. Martin may refer to:

 George Washington Martin II (1876–1948), American lawyer
 George Willard Martin (1886–1971), American mycologist